Navkat (formerly Uyali) is a village in Sughd Region, northern Tajikistan. It is part of the jamoat Zarhalol in the city of Istaravshan.

References

Populated places in Sughd Region